The 2014 Chevrolet Indy Dual in Detroit was the first doubleheader of the 2014 IndyCar Series season, hosting Rounds 6 and 7 of the 2014 IndyCar Series season. Will Power won Race 1, and Hélio Castroneves won Race 2.

Race 1 results

Notes
 Points include 1 point for leading at least 1 lap during a race, an additional 2 points for leading the most race laps, and 1 point for Pole Position.

Race 2 results

Notes
 Points include 1 point for leading at least 1 lap during a race, an additional 2 points for leading the most race laps, and 1 point for Pole Position.

 Graham Rahal was involved in a lap one crash but was able to continue until the damage became too bad to continue.

References

Chevrolet Detroit Belle Isle Grand Prix
Chevrolet Detroit Isle Grand Prix
Chevrolet Detroit Isle Grand Prix
Chevrolet Detroit Isle Grand Prix
2014 in Detroit
Detroit Indy Grand Prix